Romanian Catholic Church may refer to:

 Catholic Church in Romania, including both Latin and Eastern Catholics
 Romanian Church United with Rome, Greek-Catholic (an Eastern Catholic church of the Byzantine Rite, in full communion with the Church of Rome)

See also 
 Albanian Catholic Church
 Belarusian Catholic Church
 Bulgarian Catholic Church
 Croatian Catholic Church
 Greek Catholic Church
 Hungarian Catholic Church
 Russian Catholic Church
 Serbian Catholic Church
 Slovak Catholic Church
 Ukrainian Catholic Church